Casaleggio Novara is a comune (municipality) in the province of Novara in the Italian region Piedmont, located about  northeast of Turin and about  northwest of Novara.

References

Cities and towns in Piedmont